Iris was an unincorporated community in Ritchie County, West Virginia.

References 

Unincorporated communities in West Virginia
Unincorporated communities in Ritchie County, West Virginia